Year 1380 (MCCCLXXX) was a leap year starting on Sunday (link will display the full calendar) of the Julian calendar.

Events 
 January–December 
 February – Olaf II of Denmark also becomes Olaf IV of Norway, with his mother Margrete (Margaret) as regent. Iceland and the Faroe Islands, as parts of Norway, pass under the Danish crown.
 March 13 – The southern England town of Winchelsea in East Sussex is attacked and burned by an expeditionary force from France for a second time.
 May 31 – Grand Duke of Lithuania Jogaila signs the secret Treaty of Dovydiškės, with the Teutonic Knights. This sparks a civil war with his uncle Kęstutis.
 June 21 – Battle of Chioggia: the Venetian fleet defeats the Genoese.
 July 27 – Henry Bolingbroke marries Mary de Bohun at Arundel Castle.
 September 8 – Battle of Kulikovo: Russian forces under Grand Prince Dmitry Donskoy of Moscow resist a large invasion by the Blue Horde, Lithuania and Ryazan, stopping their advance.
 September 16 –  Charles V of France is succeeded by his twelve-year-old son, Charles VI.
 October 2 – Caterina Visconti marries her first cousin, Gian Galeazzo Visconti, later Duke of Milan, at the Church of San Giovanni in Conca.
 November 3 – Charles VI of France, who succeeded  his father (Charles V of France) in September, is crowned.

 Date unknown 
 Sir William Walworth, a member of the Fishmongers Guild, becomes Lord Mayor of London for the second time.
 Khan Tokhtamysh of the White Horde dethrones Khan Mamai of the Blue Horde. The two hordes unite to form the Golden Horde.
 Karim Al-Makhdum arrives in Jolo, and builds a mosque.
 The Hongwu Emperor purges the chancellor of China, Hu Weiyong, and abolishes that office, as he imposes direct imperial rule over the six ministries of central government, for the Ming Empire.
 The last islands of Polynesia are discovered and inhabited.
 The Companhia das Naus is founded by King Ferdinand I of Portugal.
 The imposter Paul Palaiologos Tagaris, having been appointed Latin Patriarch of Constantinople by Pope Urban VI, takes up residence in his see at Chalcis.

Births 
 February 11 – Gian Francesco Poggio Bracciolini, Italian humanist (d. 1459)
 September 8 – Saint Bernardino of Siena, Italian Franciscan missionary (d. 1444)
 November 27 – King Ferdinand I of Aragon (d. 1416)
 date unknown
 Giovanni Berardi, Archbishop of Tarentum (d. 1449)
 Nguyễn Trãi, Confucian scholar (d. 1442)
 Anne de Bourbon, French noble (d. 1408)
 Jan Želivský, Hussite priest (d. 1422)
 probable
 Huitzilihuitl II, 2nd Tlatoani (king) of Tenochtitlan (modern Mexico City), 1396–1417, father of Moctezuma I (d. c. 1417)
 Jamshīd al-Kāshī, Persian astronomer and mathematician (d. 1429)
 King Lukeni lua Nimi of the Kingdom of Kongo (d. 1420)
 Thomas à Kempis, German monk and writer (d. 1471)
 Parameshvara, Indian mathematician (d. 1425)

Deaths 
 April 29 – Saint Catherine of Siena, Italian theologian (b. 1347)
 May 5 – Saint Philotheos, Coptic martyr
 July 13 – Bertrand du Guesclin, Constable of France (b. c. 1320)
 July 26 – Emperor Kōmyō, former Emperor of Japan (b. 1322)
 September 16 – King Charles V of France (b. 1338)
 December 29 – Elizabeth of Poland, queen consort of Hungary (b. 1305)
 date unknown
 Haakon VI of Norway (b. 1340)
 Nissim of Gerona, Catalan rabbi (b. 1320)
 Khadijah of the Maldives, sovereign sultan of the Maldives
 Shams al-Dīn Abū Abd Allāh al-Khalīlī, Syrian astronomer (b. 1320)

References